Cicero is a station on Metra's BNSF Line, located in Cicero, Illinois. In Metra's zone-based fare system, Cicero is in zone B. As of 2018, Cicero is the 176th busiest of Metra's 236 non-downtown stations, with an average of 136 weekday boardings. The station is located east of the Cicero Railroad Yard, and several blocks south of the Cicero station on the Cermak Branch of the Chicago 'L''s Pink Line.

Metra rebuilt the station's platforms and shelters in 2010.

Bus connections
CTA
  35 31st/35th 
  54 Cicero 
  54B South Cicero 
  60 Blue Island/26th (Owl Service)

References

External links 

Station from Google Maps Street View

Metra stations in Illinois
Former Chicago, Burlington and Quincy Railroad stations
Cicero, Illinois
Railway stations in Cook County, Illinois
Railway stations in the United States opened in 1978